Cerchez, Cherchez or, rarely, Cerkez, is a Romanian surname that means "Circassian". A community of Circassians existed in Northern Dobruja during the 19th century. Notable people with the surname include:

 Cristian Cherchez (born 1991), Romanian professional footballer
 Cristofi Cerchez (1872–1955), Romanian architect and engineer
 Ecaterina Cercheza (1620–1666), Circassian noble and second spouse of the Moldavian voivode Vasile Lupu
 Grigore Cerchez (1850–1927), Romanian architect, engineer and professor
 Hamdi Cerchez (1941–1994), Romanian comedician of Tatar or Turkish descent
 Mihail Cerchez (1839–1885), Romanian general

See also
 Cerchez (disambiguation)
 Circassians in Romania

Romanian-language surnames
Circassians in Romania